The allowance system was a system of poor relief in Britain during the 19th century. The allowance system allowed the able-bodied poor to get allowance to boost their wages.

Sources
 Rosemary Rees, Poverty and Public Health 1815-1949,  London, Heinemann (2001)

Welfare in the United Kingdom
Poor Law in Britain and Ireland